The following is the results of the Iran Super League 2011/12 basketball season, Persian Gulf Cup.

Regular season

Standings

Results

Relegation

Playoffs

Quarterfinals 
Mahram vs. Shahrdari Gorgan

Azad University vs. Zob Ahan

Foolad Mahan vs. Melli Haffari

Petrochimi vs. Sanaye Petrochimi

Semifinals 
Mahram vs. Azad University

Foolad Mahan vs. Petrochimi

3rd place 
Azad University vs. Foolad Mahan

Final 
Mahram vs. Petrochimi

Final standings

References
 Asia Basket
 Iranian Basketball Federation

Iranian Basketball Super League seasons
League
Iran